Andrea Renzi (born 7 February 1963 in Rome, Italy) is an Italian actor. He has performed in more than 20 films since 1992.

Selected filmography

External links 
 

Italian male film actors
1963 births
Living people
Male actors from Rome